Devis Da Canal (born 18 July 1976) is an Italian biathlete. He competed in the men's sprint event at the 2002 Winter Olympics.

References

External links
 

1976 births
Living people
Italian male biathletes
Olympic biathletes of Italy
Biathletes at the 2002 Winter Olympics
Sportspeople from Sterzing